Genísio is a civil parish in the municipality of Miranda do Douro, Portugal.

The population in 2011 was 186, in an area of 29.82 km².

Population

References

Freguesias of Miranda do Douro